is a Japanese football manager. He was once in charge of Singapore Premier League side Geylang International, and is currently employed as the Assistant Manager of J2 League side Blaublitz Akita.

Managerial statistics

References

1980 births
Living people
AC Nagano Parceiro players
Geylang International FC head coaches
Japanese expatriate sportspeople in Singapore
Japanese expatriate football managers
Expatriate football managers in Singapore
Japanese football managers
Japanese footballers
Association footballers not categorized by position